The Football Queensland Premier League (known by its abbreviation FQPL) is a men's football competition contested by clubs in Queensland, Australia. It is administered by Football Queensland and is the second tier of football in Queensland, operated by a system of promotion and relegation. The league is contested by 11 clubs each season, the team that finishes at the top of the league is crowned premiers and they are promoted to the Queensland National Premier League, whilst the bottom three teams are relegated to the Football Queensland Premier League 2. The teams that finish in the top four qualify for a finals tournament, where the winners of the bracket are crowned FQPL champions.

The Football Queensland Premier League was founded in 2017, with the first season held in 2018. There was previously there was no second-tier statewide competition, instead there was only the Brisbane Premier League and subsequent Capital leagues which were the highest level of football competition in the state.

The current champions and premiers are Brisbane City, crowning the 2021 season and earning promotion to the 2022 season of the Queensland National Premier League.

History
In May 2017, Football Queensland confirmed the creation of the new competition and the teams to take part in the 2018 season. Peninsula Power were both premiers and champions of the inaugural Football Queensland Premier league, earning promotion into the 2019 NPL Queensland season along with runner-up team Capalaba.  

In March 2020 and again in August 2021, Football Queensland announced that all its competitions would be temporarily suspended due to the COVID-19 Pandemic in Australia.

Format 
The season consists of a regular season in which all clubs play each other twice, home and away. At the conclusion of the regular season the top of the table club progresses into the National Premier Leagues Queensland for the following season. Additionally, at the conclusion of the regular season the top four clubs play a local finals series. The local finals series consists of two semi-finals and a final. In the local finals series the top of the ladder club plays the fourth place and second place plays third. The winner of these local semi finals play each other in the Football Queensland Premier League Grand Finale.

Clubs

2023 season 
The following 12 clubs are participating in the 2023 season:

Honours

By season 
Seasons in bold indicate doubles with both the respective premiership and championship in a single season.

By team

Awards

Player of the year

Young Player of the year

Coach of the year

Goalkeeper of the Year

Fair Play Award

See also
National Premier Leagues Queensland
Football Queensland Premier League 2
Football Queensland

References

External links
 Football Queensland official website

Football Queensland
2
Sports leagues established in 2017
2017 establishments in Australia